In the 16th-century, London-based Corporation of Masters of the Noble Science of Defence (or "Company of Masters") Provost was the third of four ranks, the others being Scholar, Free Scholar, and Master. A Free Scholar could not be accredited as a Provost until they had studied under a registered Master for seven years (though this time requirement was occasionally shortened). Acquiring the rank of Provost required a gruelling Prize Playing with a variety of swords and other weapons, followed by a formal oath. Provosts were allowed to accept students and open their own fighting schools.

Provost is also used as a rank in Historical European martial arts organisations, such as the Association for Renaissance Martial Arts, which base their ranking systems on that of the London Company of Masters.

References

Historical European martial arts